Smoke & Mirrors is a 2016 Spanish thriller film directed by Alberto Rodríguez based on the 2006 non-fiction book Paesa, el espía de las mil caras by Manuel Cerdán. The film stars Eduard Fernández as Francisco Paesa, a former agent of the Spanish secret service who faked his own death after an infamous corruption scandal. The film premiered at the 64th San Sebastián International Film Festival, where it was awarded the Silver Shell for Best Actor for Eduard Fernández. It was also screened at the 2016 London Film Festival.

Plot
Francisco Paesa — an ex-secret agent for the Spanish government who was instrumental in the most important operation against the Basque terrorist group ETA — is framed by his own government and forced to leave the country. When he is finally able to return to Spain, he is broke and his personal life is falling apart. It is then he receives a visit from Luis Roldán, the powerful former Commissioner of Police who offers him one million dollars to help him safeguard twelve million dollars that were embezzled from the budget he used to control. Paesa’s acute mind will plan revenge in order to seize Roldán’s money, fooling an entire country in a brilliant and intricate operation worthy of the best illusionist.

Cast

Accolades

See also  
 List of Spanish films of 2016

References

External links
 
 

2016 films
2016 thriller films
Spanish political thriller films
2010s Spanish-language films
Films directed by Alberto Rodríguez Librero
Atresmedia Cine films
Zeta Studios films
Atípica Films films
Sacromonte Films films
2010s Spanish films